Neosparton is a genus of flowering plants belonging to the family Verbenaceae.

Its native range is Southern South America.

Species:

Neosparton aphyllum 
Neosparton darwinii 
Neosparton ephedroides 
Neosparton patagonicum

References

Verbenaceae
Verbenaceae genera